Christian Monyk is the head of the quantum cryptography business unit of ARC Seibersdorf research GmbH. In addition, he is the overall coordinator of Secure Communication based on Quantum Cryptography.

Notes

Year of birth missing (living people)
Living people
Austrian businesspeople
Place of birth missing (living people)